Hannes Adomeit (9 November 1942 – 25 April 2022) was a German political scientist who worked as a political analyst with emphasis on foreign policy, security and defense, transatlantic perspectives in Europe. He worked with the American Institute for Contemporary German Studies (AICGS) at Johns Hopkins University as well as Bosch Public Policy Fellow at the Transatlantic Academy in Washington, D.C. and "Non-Resident Fellow" at the Institute for Security Politics at the University of Kiel (ISPK).
He studied at the Freie Universität Berlin and received his PhD from Columbia University in 1972. He served as an expert for Soviet studies in various British, German, Canadian, and American institutes like the RAND Corporation in Santa Monica. After 1989, he taught at Tufts University, in Harvard, and in Warsaw's College of Europe.

Adomeit was born in Memel. He died on 25 April 2022 in Berlin, aged 79.

Selected publications
Inside or Outside? Russia’s Policies Towards NATO Paper Delivered to the Annual Conference of the Centre for Russian Studies at the Norwegian Institute of International Affairs (NUPI) on “The Multilateral Dimension in Russian Foreign Policy,” Oslo, 12–13 October 2006, Revised 20 December 2006  FG 5 2007/1 January 2007

References

1942 births
2022 deaths
People from Klaipėda
People from East Prussia
Columbia University alumni
German political scientists
Tufts University faculty
Academic staff of the College of Europe
Free University of Berlin alumni